El Capitan Reservoir is a reservoir in central San Diego County, California.

The 237-foot (72 m) dam is composed of hydraulic fill and was completed in 1934. The dam is owned by the city of San Diego (Originally owned by the Kumeyaae tribe) and its primary purpose is to supply drinking water. 
In order to make way for the construction of the dam, the native Kumeyaay people were forcibly relocated to the Capitan Grande Reservation. The amount of runoff that enters the reservoir varies considerably. The water in the reservoir usually consists of runoff from above the dam, but in years of drought, water is sometimes transferred to it from San Vicente Reservoir, which is the terminus of the First San Diego Aqueduct. According to the City of San Diego's General Plan Seismic Element, Division of Safety of Dams engineers "restricted the maximum water surface of El Capitan Dam to an elevation 30 feet lower than spillway, although permitting the temporary storage of storm inflows above the specified level for short periods." This requirement was added after the 1971 San Fernando earthquake, where "a loss of about 30 feet of dam height resulted" at the Lower Van Norman Dam due to "liquefaction of the hydraulic fill on the upstream side of the embankment".

There is limited recreation available at the reservoir. Boating and water skiing are available from May through October. Personal water craft are limited to a designated zone, except when towing someone. Also, the long and narrow north arm of the lake is only open to watercraft on Sundays. Fishing is allowed all year. There is no camping at the lake. The nearest camping site is about 10 miles (16 km) away at Lake Jennings.

See also
List of dams and reservoirs in California
List of lakes in California

References

City of San Diego
 

NOAA images, Van Norman Dam
San Fernando Earthquake and Van Norman Dam

Reservoirs in San Diego County, California
San Diego River
Cuyamaca Mountains
East County (San Diego County)
Reservoirs in California
Reservoirs in Southern California